British singer George Michael's releases consist of five studio albums, two compilation albums, one extended play, 47 singles, three promotional singles, 31 music videos, and five video albums. In his career, Michael sold an estimated 100 to 125 million records worldwide, making him one of the world's best-selling artists of all time.

Michael's debut solo album, Faith, was released by Columbia Records in the United States and sibling label Epic Records in the United Kingdom in October 1987. It included the singles "I Want Your Sex", "Faith" (the Billboard Hot 100 year-end number-one single of 1988 in the United States), "Father Figure", "One More Try","Monkey" and Kissing A Fool. The album peaked at number one in the UK Albums Chart, and was certified 4× Platinum by the British Phonographic Industry (BPI). It also peaked at number one on the US Billboard 200 and was certified Diamond for sales of over 10 million copies. Also in 1987, Michael collaborated with Aretha Franklin on the UK and US number one single "I Knew You Were Waiting (For Me)". In September 1990, Michael released his second album, Listen Without Prejudice Vol. 1, which peaked at number one in the UK, number two in the US, and was certified 4× Platinum by the BPI. The album spawned the singles; "Praying for Time", "Waiting for That Day", "Freedom! '90", "Heal the Pain" and "Cowboys and Angels".

In December 1991, Michael released "Don't Let the Sun Go Down on Me", a duet with Elton John; it reached number one in the UK and US. In 1992, Michael recorded "Too Funky", for the charity project Red Hot + Dance; the song reached number four in the UK and number ten in the US. In 1993, Michael released his version of Somebody To Love, which was performed at The Freddie Mercury Tribute Concert with Queen. It debuted at number one in the UK and was certified Gold. In early 1996, Michael released "Jesus to a Child", a UK number-one single. The follow-up "Fastlove", also peaked at number one in the UK. Following "Fastlove", the album Older was released, in May 1996. Other singles from the album included "Spinning the Wheel", "Star People '97" and the double A-sides "Older / I Can't Make You Love Me" and "You Have Been Loved / The Strangest Thing '97". All of these reached the UK top three. Michael released his first greatest hits collection, Ladies & Gentlemen: The Best of George Michael, in November 1998; it contained the new songs "Outside" and "As", a duet with Mary J. Blige. The album was Michael's most successful in the UK, reaching number one and it was certified 8× Platinum.

Michael's fourth solo album, Songs from the Last Century, was released in December 1999 and included cover versions of popular songs. His next album, Patience, was released in March 2004 and peaked at number one in the UK. Twenty Five, released in 2006, was Michael's second greatest hits album, celebrating the 25th anniversary of his music career. It debuted at number one in the UK. The album contains songs mainly from Michael's solo career and two new songs: "An Easier Affair" and "This Is Not Real Love" (a duet with Mutya Buena, then a member of the Sugababes, and now a member of Mutya Keisha Siobhan). In December 2008, Michael released a new track "December Song" on his website for free. The following year, "December Song" was officially released as a commercial single. This was followed by "True Faith " (which was a UK top 30 and Irish top 40 hit, and an extensive re-working of the New Order song); and "You and I", another charity single. His next single was "White Light", and it was a commercial success, reaching number 15 on the UK Singles Chart. The song has also charted in Belgium, Germany, the Netherlands, and Switzerland.

Albums

Studio albums

Compilation and live albums

Extended plays

Singles

Promotional singles

Guest appearances

Video albums

Music videos

Notes

References

External links
 
 
 
 

 Discography
Discographies of British artists
Pop music discographies